Democratic backsliding, also called autocratization, is the decline in the democratic characteristics of a political system, and is the opposite of democratization. Democracy is the most popular form of government, with more than half of the nations in the world being democracies according to a 2020 study. This study examined 165 countries and determined that 98 of them were democracies. Since the 2010s, the world has grown more authoritarian, with one quarter of the world's population under democratically backsliding hybrid regimes into the 2020s.

Proposed causes of democratic backsliding include lack of public support for democracy, economic inequality and social tensions, populist or personalist politics, and external influence from great power politics. While regime change through military coups has declined since the end of the Cold War, more subtle forms of backsliding have increased. During the third wave of democratization in the late twentieth century, many new, weakly institutionalized democracies were established. Precisely these regimes are most vulnerable to democratic backsliding. The third wave of autocratization has been ongoing since 2010, when the number of liberal democracies was at an all-time high.

In democracies, democratic decline results from the state-led weakening of political institutions that sustain the democratic system, such as the peaceful transition of power or free and fair elections. Although these political elements are assumed to lead to the onset of backsliding, the violation of individual rights that underpin democracy, especially freedom of expression, questions the health, efficiency and sustainability of democratic systems over time. During national crises, there are unique risks of democratic backsliding. It can occur when leaders impose autocratic rules during states of emergency that are either disproportionate to the severity of the crisis or remain in place after the situation has improved.

Manifestations
Democratic backsliding occurs when essential components of democracy are threatened. Examples of democratic backsliding include:
 Free and fair elections are degraded;
 Liberal rights of freedom of speech, press and association decline, impairing the ability of the political opposition to challenge the government, hold it to account, and propose alternatives to the current regime;
 The rule of law (i.e., judicial and bureaucratic restraints on the government) is weakened, such as when the independence of the judiciary is threatened, or when civil service tenure protections are weakened or eliminated.
 An over-emphasis on national security as response to acts of terrorism or perceived antagonists.

Forms 

Democratic backsliding can occur in several common ways. Backsliding is often led by democratically elected leaders, who use "incremental rather than revolutionary" tactics." As emphasized by Steven Levitsky and Daniel Ziblatt, it is difficult to pinpoint a single specific moment at which a government is no longer democratic, given that this process of decline manifests "slowly, in barely visible steps". Ozan Varol uses the phrase stealth authoritarianism to describe the practice of an authoritarian leader (or a potential authoritarian leader) using "seemingly legitimate legal mechanisms for anti-democratic ends  ... concealing anti-democratic practices under the mask of law." Together with Juan Linz (1996), Levitsky and Ziblatt developed and agreed upon their "litmus test", which includes what they believe to be the four key indicators of authoritarian behavior. These four factors are: rejection (or weak commitment to) democratic rules of the game, denial of the legitimacy of political opponents, toleration or encouragement of violence, and readiness to curtail civil liberties of opponents, including media. Varol describes the manipulation of libel laws, electoral laws, or "terrorism" laws as tools to target or discredit political opponents, and the employment of democratic rhetoric as a distraction from anti-democratic practices, as manifestations of stealth authoritarianism. In addition to these key signs derived from the behavior of leaders, Samuel P. Huntington also describes culture as a main contributor to democratic backsliding, and goes on to argue that certain cultures are particularly hostile to democracy, but they don’t necessarily prohibit democratization.

Promissory coups
In a promissory coup, an incumbent elected government is deposed in a coup d'etat by coup leaders who claim to defend democracy and promise to hold elections to restore democracy. In these situations, coup-makers emphasize the temporary and necessary nature of their intervention in order to ensure democracy in the future. This is unlike the more open-ended coups that occurred during the Cold War. Political scientist Nancy Bermeo says that "The share of successful coups that falls into the promissory category has risen significantly, from 35 percent before 1990 to 85 percent afterward." Examining 12 promissory coups in democratic states between 1990 and 2012, Bermeo found that "Few promissory coups were followed quickly by competitive elections, and fewer still paved the way for improved democracies."

Executive aggrandizement
This process contains a series of institutional changes by the elected executives, impairing the ability of the political opposition to challenge the government and hold it to account. The most important feature of executive aggrandizement is that the institutional changes are made through legal channels, making it seem as if the elected official has a democratic mandate. Some examples of executive aggrandizement are the decline of media freedom and the weakening of the rule of law (i.e., judicial and bureaucratic restraints on the government), such as when judicial autonomy is threatened.Over time, there has been a decline in active coups (in which a power-seeking individual, or small group, seizes power through forcibly, violently removing an existing government) and self-coups (involving "a freely elected chief executive suspending the constitution outright in order to amass power in one swift sweep") and an increase in executive aggrandizement. Political scientist Nancy Bermeo notes that executive aggrandizement occurs over time, through institutional changes legitimized through legal means, such as new constituent assemblies, referendums, or "existing courts or legislatures ... in cases where supporters of the executive gain majority control of such bodies." Bermeo notes that these methods mean that the aggrandizement of the executive "can be framed as having resulted from a democratic mandate." Executive aggrandizement is characterized by the presence of distress in axes of democracy, including institutional or horizontal accountability; and executive or discursive accountability.

Incremental election subversion
This form of democratic backsliding entails the subversion of free and fair elections by, for example, blocking media access, disqualifying opposition candidates and voter suppression. This form of backsliding typically takes place before Election Day and now tends to be done in a slower and more incremental way that the changes may even seem not urgent to counter, making it tougher for watchdogs like the media to find and broadcast the cumulative threat of all the mostly small, but significant misconducts. While the accumulation of power is more likely to start with this slower linear progression, it can accelerate  once voter power seems too divided or weakened to repair all the damage done to institutions.

Causes and characteristics

Populism
Pippa Norris of the Harvard Kennedy School and the University of Sydney argues that the two "twin forces" pose the largest threat to Western liberal democracies: "sporadic and random terrorist attacks on domestic soil, which damage feelings of security, and the rise of populist-authoritarian forces, which feed parasitically upon these fears." Norris defines populism as "a governing style with three defining features":
A rhetorical emphasis on the idea that "legitimate political authority is based on popular sovereignty and majority rule";
Disapproval of, and challenges to the legitimacy of, established holders of "political, cultural, and economic power";
Leadership by "maverick outsiders" who claim "to speak for the vox populi and to serve ordinary people." 
Some, but not all, populists are also authoritarian, emphasizing "the importance of protecting traditional lifestyles against perceived threats from 'outsiders', even at the expense of civil liberties and minority rights." According to Norris, the reinforcement of the insecurities from the "twin forces" has led to more support for populist-authoritarian leaders, and this latter risk was especially pronounced in the United States during the presidency of Donald Trump. For example, Norris argues that Trump benefited from the mistrust of "the establishment" and that he continuously sought to undermine faith in the legitimacy of the media and the independence of the courts.

In 2017, Cas Mudde and Cristóbal Rovira Kaltwasser wrote:

Populism does not have the same effect in each stage of the democratization process. In fact, we suggest that populism tends to play a positive role in the promotion of electoral or minimal democracy, but a negative role when it comes to fostering the development of a full-fledged liberal democratic regime. Consequently, while populism tends to favor the democratization of authoritarian regimes, it is prone to diminish the quality of liberal democracies. Populism supports popular sovereignty, but it is inclined to oppose any limitations on majority rule, such as judicial independence and  minority rights. Populism-in-power has led to processes of de-democratization (e.g., [Viktor] Orbán in Hungary or [Hugo] Chávez in Venezuela) and, in some extreme cases, even to the breakdown of the democratic regime (e.g., [Alberto] Fujimori in Peru).

A 2018 analysis by political scientists Yascha Mounk and Jordan Kyle links populism to democratic backsliding, showing that since 1990, "13 right-wing populist governments have been elected; of these, five brought about significant democratic backsliding. Over the same time period, 15 left-wing populist governments were elected; of these, the same number, five, brought about significant democratic backsliding."

A December 2018 report by the Tony Blair Institute for Global Change concluded that populist rule, whether left- or right-wing, leads to a significant risk of democratic backsliding. The authors examine the effect of populism on three major aspects of democracy: the quality of democracy in general, checks and balances on executive power and citizens' right to politically participate in a meaningful way. They conclude that populist governments are four times more likely to cause harm to democratic institutions than non-populist governments. Also, more than half of populist leaders have amended or rewritten the countries' constitution, frequently in a way that eroded checks and balances on executive power. Lastly, populists attack individual rights such as freedom of the press, civil liberties, and political rights.

In a 2018 journal article on democratic backsliding, scholars Licia Cianetti, James Dawson, and Seán Hanley argued that the emergence of populist movements in Central and Eastern Europe, such as Andrej Babiš's ANO in the Czech Republic, are "a potentially ambiguous phenomenon, articulating genuine societal demands for political reform and pushing issues of good governance centre stage, but further loosening the weak checks and balances that characterise post-communist democracy and embedding private interests at the core of the state."

In a 2019 paper, presented to the International Society of Political Psychologists, Shawn Rosenberg argues that right-wing populism is exposing a vulnerability in democratic structures and that "democracy is likely to devour itself."

Economic inequality and social discontent
Many political economy scholars, such as Daron Acemoglu and James A. Robinson, have investigated the effect of income inequality on the democratic breakdown. Studies of democratic collapse show that economic inequality is significantly higher in countries that eventually move towards a more authoritarian model. Hungary is an example of a country where a large group of unemployed, low-educated people were dissatisfied with the high levels of inequality, especially after the financial crisis of 2007–2008. Viktor Orbán used this dissatisfaction of a relatively large segment of the population to his advantage, winning popular support by using national-populist rhetoric.

Personalism 

A 2019 study found that personalism had an adverse impact on democracy in Latin America: "presidents who dominate their own weakly organized parties are more likely to seek to concentrate power, undermine horizontal accountability, and trample the rule of law than presidents who preside over parties that have an independent leadership and an institutionalized bureaucracy."

COVID-19 

Many national governments worldwide delayed, postponed or canceled a variety of democratic elections at both national and subnational governmental levels resulting in the COVID-19 pandemic opening gaps in the action of democracy.

According to the V-Dem Institute, only 39% of all countries have committed no or minor violations of democratic standards in response to COVID-19. Regardless of the fact that liberal democracy was on the defensive and experiencing a rise of autocrats and authoritarian regimes in many parts of the world prior to the first coronavirus death in December 2019, the pandemic has had a major influence on democratic backsliding.

Great power politics 
Great power transitions have contributed to democratic backsliding and the spread of authoritarianism in two ways: "First, the sudden rise of autocratic Great Powers led to waves of autocracy driven by conquest but also by self-interest and even admiration, as in the fascist wave of the 1930s or the post-1945 communist wave. Second, the sudden rise of democratic hegemons led to waves of democratization, but these waves inevitably overextended and collapsed, leading to failed consolidation and rollback."

Authoritarian values 
Global variation in democracy is primarily explained by variance between popular adherence to authoritarian values vs. emancipative values, which explains around 70 percent of the variation of democracy between countries every year since 1960. Emancipative values, as measured by the World Values Survey, have been consistently rising over time in response to increasing economic prosperity.

A 2020 study, which used World Values Survey data, found that cultural conservatism was the ideological group most open to authoritarian governance within Western democracies. Within English-speaking Western democracies, "protection-based" attitudes combining cultural conservatism and leftist economic attitudes were the strongest predictor of support for authoritarian modes of governance.

Professor Jessica Stern and the political psychologist Karen Stenner write that international research finds that "perceptions of sociocultural threat" (such as rising ethnic diversity, tolerance for LGBT people) are more important in explaining how democracies turn authoritarian compared to economic inequality (though they include economic threats such as globalization and the rising prosperity of other ethnic groups). Stern and Stenner say about a third of the population in Western countries is predisposed to favor homogeneity, obedience, and strong leaders over diversity and freedom. In their view, authoritarianism is only loosely correlated with conservatism, which may defend a liberal democracy as the status quo.

Political scientist Christian Welzel argues that the third wave of democratization overshot the demand for democracy in some countries. Therefore, Welzel sees the current autocratization trend as regression to the mean, but expects that it too will reverse in response to long-term changes in values.

Polarization, misinformation, incrementalism, and multi-factor explanations 

The 2019 Annual Democracy Report of the V-Dem Institute at the University of Gothenburg identified three challenges confronting global democracy: (1) "Government manipulation of media, civil society, rule of law, and elections"; (2) rising "toxic polarization", including "the division of society into distrustful, antagonistic camps"; diminishing "respect for opponents, factual reasoning, and engagement with society" among political elites; and increasing use of hate speech by political leaders; and (3) foreign disinformation campaigns, primarily digital, and mostly affecting Taiwan, the United States, and former Soviet bloc nations such as Latvia.

According to Suzanne Mettler and Robert C. Lieberman, four characteristics have typically provided the conditions for democratic backsliding (alone or in combination): Political polarization, racism and nativism, economic inequality, and excessive executive power. Stephen Haggard and Robert Kaufman highlight three key causes of backsliding: "the pernicious effects of polarization; realignments of party systems that enable elected autocrats to gain legislative power; and the incremental nature of derogations, which divides oppositions and keeps them off balance." A 2022 study linked polarization to support for undemocratic politicians.

Prevalence and trends

A study by the Varieties of Democracy Project (V-Dem) of the V-Dem Institute at the University of Gothenburg, which contains more than eighteen-million data points relevant to democracy, measuring 350 highly specific indicators across 174 countries as of the end of 2016, found that the number of democracies in the world modestly declined from 100 in 2011 to 97 in 2017; some countries moved toward democracy, while other countries moved away from democracy. V-Dem's 2019 Annual Democracy Report found that the trend of autocratization continued, while "24 countries are now severely affected by what is established as a 'third wave of autocratization'" including "populous countries such as Brazil, Bangladesh and the United States, as well as several Eastern European countries" (specifically Bulgaria and Serbia).  The report found that an increasing proportion of the world population lived in countries undergoing autocratization (2.3 billion in 2018). The report found that while the majority of countries were democracies, the number of liberal democracies declined to 39 by 2018 (down from 44 a decade earlier). The research group Freedom House, in reports in 2017 and 2019, identified democratic backsliding in a variety of regions across the world. Freedom House's 2019 Freedom in the World report, titled Democracy in Retreat, showed freedom of expression declining each year over the preceding 13 years, with sharper drops since 2012.

Scholarly work in the 2010s detailed democratic backsliding, in various forms and to various extents, in Hungary and Poland, the Czech Republic, Turkey, Brazil, Venezuela, and India. The scholarly recognition of the concept of democratic backsliding reflects a reversal from older views, which held "that democracy, once attained in a fairly wealthy state, would become a permanent fixture." This older view came to be realized as erroneous beginning in the mid-2000s, as multiple scholars acknowledged that some seemingly-stable democracies have recently faced a decline in the quality of their democracy. Huq and Ginsburg identified in an academic paper "37 instances in 25 different countries in the postwar period in which democratic quality declined significantly (though a fully authoritarian regime didn't emerge)", including countries that were "seemingly stable, reasonably wealthy" democracies.

The 2020 report of the Varieties of Democracy Institute found that the global share of democracies declined from 54% in 2009 to 49% in 2019, and that a greater share of the global population lived in autocratizing countries (6% in 2009, 34% in 2019). The 10 countries with the highest degree of democratizing from 2009 to 2019 were Tunisia, Armenia, The Gambia, Sri Lanka, Madagascar, Myanmar, Fiji, Kyrgyzstan, Ecuador, and Niger; the 10 countries with the highest degree of autocratizing from 2009 to 2019 were Hungary, Turkey, Poland, Serbia, Brazil, Bangladesh, Mali, Thailand, Nicaragua, and Zambia. However, the institute found that signs of hope in an "unprecedented degree of mobilization for democracy" as reflected in increases in pro-democracy mass mobilization; the proportion of countries with "substantial pro-democracy mass protests" increased to 44% in 2019 (from 27% in 2009). According to a 2020 study, "Democratic backsliding does not necessarily see all democratic institutions erode in parallel fashion... we establish that elections are improving and rights are retracting in the same time period, and in many of the same cases."

Central and Eastern Europe 

In the 2010s, a scholarly consensus developed that the Central and Eastern Europe region was experiencing democratic backsliding, most prominently in Hungary and Poland, and the European Union (EU) failed to prevent democratic backsliding in some of its other member states. Rutgers University political scientist R. Daniel Kelemen argues that EU membership has enabled an "authoritarian equilibrium" and may even make it easier for authoritarian-minded leaders to erode democracy due to the EU's system of party politics, a reluctance to interfere in domestic political matters; appropriation of EU funds by backsliding regimes; and free movement for dissatisfied citizens, which allows citizens to leave backsliding regimes and deplete the opposition while strengthening the regimes. According to Dalia Research's 2020 poll, only 38 percent of Polish citizens and 36 percent of Hungarian citizens believe that their countries are democratic, while the rest say they would like their countries to be more democratic.

United States

Effects of judicial independence
A 2011 study examined the effects of judicial independence in preventing democratic backsliding. The study, which analyzed 163 nations from 1960 to 2000, concluded that established independent judiciaries are successful at preventing democracies from drifting to authoritarianism, but that states with newly formed courts "are positively associated with regime collapses in both democracies and nondemocracies".

See also
 Totalitarianism

References

Further reading

 

Jee, Haemin; Lueders, Hans; Myrick, Rachel (2021). "Towards a unified approach to research on democratic backsliding". Democratization

Przeworski, Adam. 2019. Crises of Democracy. Cambridge: Cambridge University Press.

External links
 Democratic Erosion, a site prepared by a consortium of universities

 
Authoritarianism
Democracy
Human rights concepts
Political science terminology
Populism